
Walden School was a private day school in Manhattan, New York City, that operated from 1914 until 1988, when it merged with the New Lincoln School; the merged school closed in 1991. Walden was known as an innovator in progressive education.  Faculty were addressed by first names and students were given great leeway in determining their course of study.  Located on Central Park West at 88th Street, the school was very popular with intellectual families from the Upper West Side and with families based in Greenwich Village. The Walden School was founded in 1914 by Margaret Naumburg, an educator who later became an art therapist. Claire Raphael Reis, a musician, was also involved.

Naumburg, who had been exposed to the theories of John Dewey at Columbia University, embraced "individual transformation" as an education principle, encouraging creative expression and self-motivated learning. Throughout its history, the Walden School emphasized the visual and performing arts. Competition between students was minimized. No standardized exams were required for admission.

Walden's original building at Central Park West and 88th Street has been demolished. However, Walden's adjacent building at 1 West 88th, now known as the Goodman Building after Walden alumnus and civil rights martyr Andrew Goodman, is now occupied by Trevor Day School.

Notable faculty 
 Hans Maeder taught at Walden School and served as its interim head in the 1940s before leaving to start Stockbridge School in Massachusetts.
 Florence Cane taught art, sister of Margaret Naumburg
Stanley Bosworth taught French, before going on to lead Saint Ann's School in Brooklyn

Notable alumni
Neil Barsky, journalist
Paul Freedman, historian 
Elmer Bernstein (1922–2004), jazz and film composer
John Berry (1963–2016), musician and founding member of the Beastie Boys
Matthew Broderick (1962–), actor
Adam Clymer (1937–2018), journalist and author
Michael Diamond (1965–), member of the Beastie Boys
Helga Davis (1964-), multidisciplinary artist
 Jane Dudley (1912–2001), modern dancer
 Yvette (Hardman) Edmondson,(1915-2006) oceanographer and journal editor
Peter Elias (1923–2001), professor of electrical engineering and computer science at MIT
Carol Gilligan (1936–), educational psychologist
Leonard Gillman (1917-2009), pianist and mathematician
Andrew Goodman (1943–1964), civil rights activist
Alex Guarnaschelli (1972–), celebrity chef and television personality
Steven Heller (1960–), design writer
Peter Kivy (1934–2017), professor of musicology and philosophy at Rutgers University
Saul Landau (1936–2013), documentary filmmaker, author, biographer of Fidel Castro
Jeanne Lee (1939–2000), jazz singer
Glenn Ligon (1960–), conceptual artist
Kenneth Lonergan (1962–), playwright, film director
Janet Margolin (1943–1993), theater, television and film actress
Mike Nichols (1931–2014), film and theatre director, producer, actor and comedian
Robert Paterson (1970–),composer
Abigail Pogrebin (1965-), writer, journalist, podcast host
Robin Pogrebin (1965-), reporter
Mark G. Raizen, physicist
Simon Rosenberg (1963–), political activist and founder of New Democrat Network and the New Policy Institute
Susan Rosenberg (1955–), activist
Tony Saletan (1931–), American folksinger and musician
Raphael Sbarge (1964-), actor
Kyra Sedgwick (1965-), actor, producer, director
Jane Stern (1946–), food writer
Edgar Tafel (1912–2011), architect
Richard Teitelbaum (1939–2020), composer, keyboardist, and improvisor
Barbara Tuchman (1912–1989), historian
David Zwirner (1964–), contemporary art dealer

References 
Notes

Further reading
 Margaret Naumburg (1928), The Child and the World: Dialogues in Modern Education. New York: Harcourt Brace.

External links 
 Margaret Naumburg and Florence Cane, student paper in Women's Intellectual Contributions to the Study of Mind and Society, Webster University

Defunct schools in New York City
Educational institutions disestablished in 1988
Educational institutions established in 1914
Upper West Side
1914 establishments in New York City